Myeongsin Girl's High School is a private girls' school located in sangok-dong, Bupyeong-gu, Incheon, South Korea. It was founded in December 1970 under the name Myeongsin Girls' School (hangul: 명신여학교; hanja: 明新女學校), and has been established 40 years before.

External links
Myeongsin Girl's High School Homepage - Korean language version only.

Education in Incheon
High schools in South Korea
Girls' schools in South Korea
Educational institutions established in 1970
Bupyeong District